Naked Normandy is a 2018 French comedy-drama film directed by Philippe Le Guay.

Cast 
 François Cluzet - Georges Balbuzard
 François-Xavier Demaison - Thierry Levasseur
 Julie-Anne Roth - Valérie Levasseur
 Pili Groyne - Chloé Levasseur
 Toby Jones - Newman
 Vincent Regan - Bradley
 Colin Bates - Ross
 Arthur Dupont - Vincent Jousselin

References

External links 

2018 comedy-drama films
French comedy-drama films